Bulinus abyssinicus is a species of tropical freshwater snail with a sinistral shell, an aquatic gastropod mollusk in the family Planorbidae, the ramshorn snails and their allies.

The specific name abyssinicus is after Abyssinia, which was the historic name for the Ethiopian Empire, where its type locality is.

Distribution
The distribution of Bulinus abyssinicus includes the Lower Valley of the Awash, Ethiopia and Somalia.

The type locality is "southern Abyssinia", which means the Ethiopian Empire, now Ethiopia.

Description 
The width of the shell is 9 mm. The height of the shell is 14 mm.

The diploid chromosome number is 2n = 36.

Ecology 
This small snail resides in marshes and in pools.

This species is an intermediate host for Schistosoma bovis and Schistosoma haematobium.

References

Further reading
 Ahmed M. D., Upatham E. S., Brockelman W. Y. & Viyanant V. (1986). "Population responses of the snail Bulinus (P.) abyssinicus to differing initial social and crowding conditions". Malacological Review 19: 83-89.
 Maffi M. (1960). "Primo reperto ne basso oltregiuba, Somalia, dei Molluschi d’aqua dolce: Bulinus (P.) abyssinicus, etc." Parassitologia 2: 191-206.
 Upatham E. S., Koura M., Ahmed M. D. & Awad A. H. (1981). "Studies on the transmission of S. haematobium and the bionomics of Bulinus (P.) abyssinicus in the Somali Democratic Republic". Annals of Tropical Medicine and Parasitology 75: 63-69.

Bulinus
Gastropods described in 1866